Dikmen is a town and district of Sinop Province, Turkey.

Dikmen (Turkish: a conical hill) may refer to:

People
 Dikmen (surname)

Places
 Dikmen, Aksaray, a village in the district of Aksaray, Aksaray Province, Turkey
 Dikmen, Akseki, a village in the district of Akseki, Antalya Province, Turkey
 Dikmen, Beypazarı, a village in the district of Beypazarı, Ankara Province, Turkey
 Dikmen, Biga
 Dikmen, Gerede, a village in the district of Gerede, Bolu Province, Turkey
 Dikmen, İliç
 Dikmen, Karacasu, a village in the district of Karacasu, Aydın Province, Turkey
 Dikmen, Mardin, a town in the district of Kızıltepe, Mardin Province, Turkey
 Dikmen, Manavgat, a village in the district of Manavgat, Antalya Province, Turkey
 Dikmen, Serik, a village in the district of Serik, Antalya Province, Turkey
 Dikmen, Sivrice
 Dikmen, Cyprus, Turkish name of the Cypriot village of Dikomo